Surendra Kumar Dey, (Sep. 13th, 1906 - May 24, 1989) was India's first Union Cabinet minister for Cooperation and Panchyati Raj. Mr. Dey is remembered as the man who pioneered and steered community development in independent India. He firmly believed that democracy cannot be practiced by government servants and stressed that the fruits of democracy ought to reach every village.

Early life
S. K. Dey was born on 13 September 1906 in Laxmibassa village in Sylhet district in present-day Bangladesh, Mr. Dey went on to study engineering at world-renowned institutions- Purdue University and Michigan in the United States of America. Dey was a son-in-law of the eminent nationalist leader, Bipin Chandra Pal.

Career
He began his career by serving as the Honorary Technical Advisor to the Ministry of Rehabilitation, Government of India (1948–51). It was in this post that Dey proved his mettle as a “social engineer” and was noticed by top government, including then-Prime Minister, Jawaharlal Nehru.

Tenure as Minister
Dey's vitality and commitment to developing grassroots democracy prompted Prime Minister Jawaharlal Nehru to hand over the reins of Rural Development in newly independent India to Mr. Dey.

After Nehru's death, Dey resigned from the ministry and dedicated his time to build Panchayati Raj institutions in the country. As minister, his pet project was the Community Development Programme (1953) which would later form the basis of Community Development Blocks across the country. Mr. Dey's concept of community development was rooted in his belief that the community could help itself rather than looking “towards the government as Mai-Baap.” Mr. Dey's model of community development is characterized by a three-pronged strategy- development of the area, coordinated
administration and development of the individual and the community.

The first Community Development Project was undertaken in Etawah U.P in 1948. During 1952, 55 such projects were taken up across the country. Taking their success into account, the Community Development Programme was scaled up to all blocks in the country.

Rural Township
In 1949, Dey designed the concept of an agro-industrial township for rural development. The thrust of this model was its focus on a combination of agriculture and industrial development. The township would be provided support in terms of goods and services by surrounding villages. It would be self-sufficient and function on the basis of cooperation.

This model materialized as the “Mazdoori Manzil” project in 1950, in Nilokheri, Haryana. The project benefitted 7000 homeless refugees from Pakistan. Mr. Dey considered this model to be welfare state in action.

Impressed with the model, Nehru termed it to be the “Mecca of Development” and called for the creation of many more Nilokher is across the country. Unfortunately, over the years, Nilokheri has been lost to obscurity and lacks evenbasic facilities such as health, water and education.

S.K. Dey appears to have been influenced, on the one hand, by Rabindranath Tagore’s Shantiniketan experiment for Rural Development and, on the other, by the Gandhian idea of Rural Construction, which laid stress on self-sufficiency and manual labour. It could also be perceived as a Model of Rural Development based on a synthesis of Liberalism, Marxism and Gandhi-ism. The emphasis on individual liberty seems to have been imbibed from Liberalism, stress on right and duty to work from Marxism and that of small scale cottage and village industries from Gandhi-ism.

Panchayati Raj
Dey was a member of the Balwantrai Mehta Committee (1957) that was set up to study the Community
Development Programme. The Committee assessed the extent to which the programme had succeeded in utilizing local initiatives and in creating institutions to ensure continuity in the process of improving economic and social conditions in rural areas. The Committee held that community development would be deep and enduring only when the community was involved in the planning, decision -making and implementation process, thus making a case for a strong Panchayati Raj system. The Balwantrai Mehta Committee proposed a seminal developmental role for Panchayati Raj Institution in rural development and termed these as necessary for the success of community development and national extension programmes.

Dey attributed philosophical connotations to the Panchayati Raj, which he explained in detail in his book “Panchayat-i-Raj, a Synthesis.” He elucidates that the Panchayati Raj was an important link between the individual and the world at large. Dey visualized an intimate relationship
between the Gram Sabha and the Lok Sabha and said that democracy was to flow from the Parliament to the Gram Sabha. Dey urged state governments to give priority to establishing PRIs their respective states. By the 1960s, all states had legislated on PRIs and more 2, 17, 300 Panchayats had come into being.

Other Achievements
Mr. Dey also played an instrumental role in the institution of the National Development Council. Mr. Dey's has made a
marked contribution to the field of development journalism by being the guiding force behind “Kurukshetra”, the
monthly organ of the Ministry of Rural Development. Mr. Dey was a rare blend of a philosopher and practitioner who
played an important role in the nation-building process for more than four decades after Independence. His
pioneering contribution to the concept and implementation of rural development and Panchayati Raj merits special
attention from social scientists, administrators, political leaders and other stakeholders in the project for rural
development and decentralized rural governance

References

Karnal
1906 births
1989 deaths
India MPs 1962–1967
Indian agnostics
Asian democratic socialists
Indian independence activists from Bengal
Indian National Army trials
Indian socialists
People from Sylhet Division
Members of the Constituent Assembly of India
20th-century Indian philosophers
Recipients of the Padma Shri in civil service
Bengali writers
Lok Sabha members from Rajasthan
People from Nagaur district